Medama diplaga is a moth in the family Erebidae first described by George Hampson in 1910. It is found in Taiwan and India.

References

Moths described in 1910
Lymantriinae